A White House Diary is a 1970 memoir by Lady Bird Johnson.

Writing and publication 
Lady Bird Johnson regularly made tape-recorded notes of her daily activities while her husband was president. The diary totaled 1.75 million words of voice recordings when Lyndon left office, and Lady Bird worked to trim it by a factor of about seven to be published. She said that the finished book was a record of "hopefully significant days, but some quiet days" as well. The 860-page book was published on December 30, 1970, by Holt, Rinehart and Winston.

Reception 
A review in The American Historical Review praised the book, which was published around the same time as Lyndon's The Vantage Point, for its insight into the American presidency. Jean Stafford in The New York Review of Books considered the book to have a "lubberly vocabulary" and said Johnson could instead have "stuck to her homey colloquialisms". Stafford thought the book's importance was "questionable" because Johnson didn't go into much detail about the political side of the presidency and included little gossip. Stafford concluded that "It is a harmless book, but it is very long."

James Brady, writing for The Washington Post, called the book "a simply splendid account", feeling that "there never has been, and perhaps never will be, such an intimate glance of power in its private moments." He concluded that the book was "extraordinary". A reviewer in The New York Times reviewed the book favorably, noting that it was "intensely personal" and considered it to have "fascinating" details. Dorothy Rabinowitz in Commentary described the book as "a full, and disturbing, replay of the nation's troubles [during Johnson's term as president]."

References

1970 non-fiction books
American memoirs
Books written by first ladies of the United States
Holt, Rinehart and Winston books